Strandzha (also transliterated as Strandja, ;  , or  ) is a mountain massif in southeastern Bulgaria and the European part of Turkey. It is in the southeastern part of the Balkans between the plains of Thrace to the west, the lowlands near Burgas to the north, and the Black Sea to the east. Its highest peak is Mahya Dağı (Mahiada) in Turkey, while the highest point on Bulgarian territory is Golyamo Gradishte.

The name of the massif allegedly derives from Istranca, the former name of the municipality of Binkılıç in Çatalca district, Istanbul province.

Geography and climate

The climate of the area is considerably influenced by the Black Sea and is predominantly humid continental in the mountains and humid subtropical at the coast. Major rivers in the area are the Veleka ( long) and the border river Rezovska ( long).

Strandzha Nature Park
Strandzha Nature Park, established in 1995 in the Bulgarian part of the massif, is the largest protected area in Bulgaria, embracing , or about 1% of Bulgaria's total territory.

History and culture
Inhabited by the Thracians in antiquity, Strandzha is an area with a large concentration of ruins of Thracian sanctuaries, sacrificial altars, dolmens, and other archaeological objects.

The mountains were the site of the Bulgarian Preobrazhenie Uprising of 1903 that was crushed by Ottoman troops. The current Bulgarian-Turkish border in the region was established after the Balkan Wars of 1912-1913, when the northern part of Strandzha became part of Bulgaria.

Culturally, the Bulgarian part of Strandzha is known for the specific architecture that can be observed in Malko Tarnovo, Brashlyan, and most other villages, the rich folklore and distinctive rituals, such as nestinarstvo (barefoot dancing on live embers), that preserve pagan elements.

Flora and fauna
The Strandzha Mountains have a rich and diverse flora and fauna, unique within Europe. The eastern part of Strandzha is covered by the most northwestern extent of the Euxine–Colchic deciduous forests ecoregion. 50% of Bulgaria's flora can be observed in Strandzha Nature Park and the area has 121 habitat types. In Strandzha over 600 species of invertebrates are found, as well as over 400 species of vertebrates, 41 species of freshwater fish, 10 species of amphibians, over 20 species of reptile, more than 130 species of breeding birds, and over 60 species of mammals.

One of the reasons for the abundance of flora and fauna is the area's location at a bio-geographical crossroad between the European and Asian continents.

The plant communities in Strandzha developed before Europe was separated from Asia by the formation of the Bosporus Strait that now connects the Black Sea with the Mediterranean Sea. Land-ice never reached Strandzha during the ice-ages of the Pleistocene and the Holocene. This lack of glaciations helped create the circumstances in which flora characteristic for the Tertiary period on the European continent has been preserved in Strandzha.

Honour
Strandzha Glacier on Livingston Island in the South Shetland Islands, Antarctica is named after Strandzha Mountain.

References

External links

Intelligent Life magazine feature 'Forest of Eternal Return'
The website of Strandja National Park (in Bulgarian)
Images from Strandja
More images from Strandja
SNC Zlatna Strandja 
Discover Strandja 
Strandja.hit.bg
Hiking in Strandzha Mountains
StrandjaVillage.com
General info Strandja Nature Park
Nature in Strandja
 

 
Mountain ranges of Europe
Mountain ranges of Bulgaria
Mountain ranges of Turkey
Landforms of Burgas Province
International mountains of Europe
Landforms of Kırklareli Province